Bucynthia borchmanni is a species of beetle in the family Cerambycidae. It was described by Breuning in 1959. It is known from Australia.

References

Desmiphorini
Beetles described in 1959